Snap Your Fingers is an album by trombonist Al Grey released in 1962 on Argo Records featuring studio and live recordings.

Reception 

The Allmusic review by Ken Dryden stated "Trombonist Al Grey is joined by emerging young tenor saxophonist Billy Mitchell on this pair of 1962 sessions ... There's not a bad track on this".

Track listing 
 "Nothing But the Truth" (Billy Bowen) – 3:20
 "Three-Fourth Blues" (Gene Kee) – 5:23
 "Just Waiting" (Melba Liston) – 2:57
 "R. B. Q." (Kee) – 4:58
 "Green Dolphin Street" (Bronisław Kaper, Ned Washington) – 4:19
 "Minor on Top" (Thad Jones) – 6:50
 "African Lady" (Randy Weston) – 4:29
 "Hi-Fly" (Weston) – 9:22
Recorded at Birdland, NYC on  January 31, 1962 (tracks 6–8) and Ter-Mar Studios, Chicago, IL on February 19, 1962 (tracks 1–5)

Personnel 
Al Grey – trombone
Billy Mitchell – tenor saxophone
David Burns (tracks 1–5), Donald Byrd (tracks 6–8) – trumpet
Bobby Hutcherson – vibraphone
Herbie Hancock (tracks 6–8), Floyd Morris (tracks 1–5) – piano
Herman Wright – bass
Eddie Williams – drums

References 

1962 albums
Al Grey albums
Billy Mitchell (jazz musician) albums
Argo Records albums
Albums produced by Ralph Bass